The Type 075 landing helicopter dock (NATO reporting name: Yushen-class landing helicopter assault) is a class of Chinese amphibious assault ships built by Hudong–Zhonghua Shipbuilding for the People's Liberation Army Navy (PLAN). It has a full-length flight deck for helicopter operations and features a floodable well deck from which to disembark hovercraft and armored amphibious assault vehicles.

History
The Marine Design and Research Institute of China (708 Institute) of the China State Shipbuilding Corporation began design work in 2011. Debate over the desired result may have continued into 2016. Reportedly, the Central Military Commission Equipment Development Department favored a smaller design than the final Type 075, effectively an enlarged Type 071 amphibious transport dock, possibly due to concerns that the existing propulsion plant was insufficient for a larger ship. Ultimately, the PLAN's desire for an LHA prevailed. Hudong–Zhonghua Shipbuilding received the contract in 2018 and construction began that year. 

Images of Hainan, the first ship, under construction in drydock appeared by June 2019. She suffered a minor fire while fitting out in April 2020 which did not slow construction. Hainan commissioned on 23 April 2021 and reached  initial operating capability in March 2022.

In November 2022, The PLAN announced that the first two ships were combat ready.

Design
The flight deck is 226 meters long and 36 meters wide. There are seven flight spots - six along the port side and one aft of the island. The forward aircraft elevator can carry one medium helicopter with rotors folded; the stern elevator is larger and can carry Changhe Z-8 helicopters with rotors folded. Two weapons elevators are located on the forward flight deck. The hangar may be 150 meters long, 20 meters wide, and 6 meters high. The ship may operate 20-35 aircraft.

The well deck and vehicle deck are one continuous space. The well deck has a 20 meter wide gate and may be 80-90 meters long, sufficient for two or three Type 726 LCACs. The vehicle deck is large enough for a PLAN Marine Corps amphibious mechanized infantry company plus additional platoon-sized tank or artillery elements. An opening on each side allows roll-on/roll-off access to the vehicle deck.

List of ships

See also
People's Liberation Army Navy Surface Force
List of ships of the People's Liberation Army Navy

Citations

Sources

 

Amphibious warfare vessel classes
Amphibious warfare vessels of the People's Liberation Army Navy
Helicopter carrier classes